Haldizen Mountains are a mountain range in north eastern Turkey, Trabzon. It's part of the Pontic Alps. The highest peaks stretch along the Trabzon-Bayburt border and are Demirkapı (3.376 m.), Kayışkıran (3.156 m.) and Karakaya (3.139 m.). The word haldizen is of Laz origin.

References

Mountain ranges of Turkey